Reid Buchanan (born February 3, 1993) is an American long-distance runner. In 2019, he won the silver medal in the men's 10,000 metres event at the 2019 Pan American Games held in Lima, Peru.

In 2019, he won the bronze medal in the senior 10,000 metres event at the 2019 NACAC Cross Country Championships held in Port of Spain, Trinidad and Tobago.

References

External links 
 

Living people
1993 births
American male long-distance runners
Place of birth missing (living people)
Athletes (track and field) at the 2019 Pan American Games
Medalists at the 2019 Pan American Games
Pan American Games silver medalists for the United States
Pan American Games medalists in athletics (track and field)
Pan American Games track and field athletes for the United States
21st-century American people